Harald Smedal (5 April 1859 – 3 May 1911) was a Norwegian politician of the Liberal Party. He served as a member of the Council of State Division in Stockholm from 1895 to 1896, Minister of Auditing from 1896 to 1897, and Minister of Justice from 1897 to 1898.

References

1859 births
1911 deaths
Government ministers of Norway
Ministers of Justice of Norway